Boana ericae is a species of frog in the family Hylidae. It is endemic to Brazil and only known from its type locality, Chapada dos Veadeiros National Park in the Goiás state. The specific name ericae honors Erica Maria Pellegrini Caramaschi, a Brazilian ichthyologist (and presumably the spouse of U. Caramaschi).

Habitat and conservation
It breeds in the same habitat. It is a common species, but its habitat is threatened by logging, mining, and fires. Nevertheless, the type locality is within a protected area.

References

Boana
Amphibians of Brazil
Endemic fauna of Brazil
Taxa named by Ulisses Caramaschi
Amphibians described in 2000
Taxonomy articles created by Polbot